On 5 September 2005, a Kavatshi Airlines Antonov An-26B crashed on approach to Matari Airport in Isiro, Democratic Republic of the Congo, killing all 11 people on board.

Accident 
Antonov An-26B ER-AZT was on approach to landing on 5 September 2005 at the end of a non-scheduled domestic passenger flight in the Democratic Republic of the Congo from Beni Airport in Beni to Matari Airport in Isiro. At about 07:30 local time, while on final approach to Runway 31 in fog, the aircraft struck a tree, crashed  from the airport, and caught fire, killing all 11 people (four crew members and seven passengers) on board. The accident occurred on the same day just an hour after another commercial plane Mandala Airlines Flight 91 crashed shortly after takeoff from Medan with 149 fatalities.

Aircraft 
The aircraft was a twin-engine Antonov An-26B, manufacturer's serial number 9005, which had first flown in 1979 and was registered as ER-AZT. The Galaxie Corporation, which did business in the Democratic Republic of the Congo as Kavatshi Airlines, leased the aircraft from Aerocom in November 2003. The aircraft's airworthiness certificate expired in September 2004, but the aircraft remained in service.

References

External links 

2005 disasters in Africa
Airliner accidents and incidents involving controlled flight into terrain
Aviation accidents and incidents in the Democratic Republic of the Congo
Aviation accidents and incidents in 2005
Accidents and incidents involving the Antonov An-26
2005 in the Democratic Republic of the Congo
Isiro
September 2005 events in Africa